The Last Supper is a 1994 drama film directed by Cynthia Roberts.

Plot
Chris (Ken McDougall) is a dancer dying of AIDS. Before his assisted suicide, he shares a last meal with his lover Val (J.D. Nicholsen).

Cast
Daniel MacIvor as Dr. Parthens
Ken McDougall as Chris
J.D. Nicholsen as Val

Production
The Last Supper is adapted from the theatrical play of the same name by Hillar Liitoja, first staged by Theatre Passe Muraille in 1993. McDougall originated the lead role in the stage production, opposite James Allodi as Val and Sky Gilbert as Dr. Parthens.

The film was shot in real time and set entirely in one room at Toronto's Casey House AIDS hospice. Ken McDougall died of AIDS complications four days after filming finished.

Reception
The Last Supper won the Teddy Award for Best Feature Film at the 1995 Berlin International Film Festival. Time Out called the film "simple but devastating study of the human condition in extremis". Variety called it "an important addition to the growing body of pix about AIDS-related issues" but said that it may be too gruelling for some viewers.

References

External links

 

1994 films
1994 drama films
1990s English-language films
Canadian independent films
Canadian LGBT-related films
1994 LGBT-related films
Canadian drama films
LGBT-related drama films
HIV/AIDS in Canadian films
Films based on Canadian plays
1994 independent films
1990s Canadian films